Caitlin Regal (born 9 February 1992) is a New Zealand canoeist. On 3 August 2021 she won a gold medal alongside Lisa Carrington in the K-2 500 metres event.

Early life
Regal was born on 9 February 1992 in Takapuna, a suburb of North Shore. Aged 5, she joined the Red Beach Surf Life Saving & Squash Club on the Hibiscus Coast north of Auckland, where she later competed in surf competition. By age 14, she had qualified as a life guard. She has won numerous titles at the New Zealand Surf Life Saving Championships.

Canoeing
At the 2015 Canoe World Cup in Portugal, she won gold in the Women's K-4 500 metres event, and silver in the Women's K-2 500 metres event. She represented New Zealand at the 2016 Summer Olympics finishing fifth in the Women's K-4 500 metres alongside Jaimee Lovett, Kayla Imrie and Aimee Fisher. 

At the 2020 Summer Olympics in Tokyo, she once again represented New Zealand. She competed in the Women's K-1 500 metres,  Women's K-2 500 metres, and Women's K-4 500 metres.

Personal life
Caitlin Ryan married her partner, Nick Regal, in early 2021.

References

External links

1992 births
Living people
Olympic canoeists of New Zealand
Canoeists at the 2016 Summer Olympics
People from Takapuna
Sportspeople from Auckland
New Zealand female canoeists
New Zealand surf lifesavers
ICF Canoe Sprint World Championships medalists in kayak
Canoeists at the 2020 Summer Olympics
Medalists at the 2020 Summer Olympics
Olympic medalists in canoeing
Olympic gold medalists for New Zealand